Parasuramalingeswarar Temple is a Hindu temple situated in the neighbourhood of Ayanavaram in Chennai, India. The presiding deity is Shiva as Parasuramalingeswarar and the goddess is Parvathi as Parvathambigai. The main idol is in the form of a linga.

Location 
Located at an altitude of about 35 m above the mean sea level, the geographical coordinates of Parasuramalingeswarar temple are 13°05'51.5"N 80°13'32.3"E (i.e. 13.097630°N 80.225650°E).

Gallery

See also

 Religion in Chennai

References 
 

Hindu temples in Chennai